Korucuk is a village in Anamur district of Mersin Province, Turkey. At  it is situated to the northwest of Anamur. The population of Korucuk is 228  as of 2011.

References

Villages in Anamur District